Rosticciana or rostinciana  is a traditional Italian pork food from the region of Tuscany, grilled on charcoal or wood fire.

It consists of pork ribs that are seasoned with various spices (sometimes just pepper and salt) and rosemary dipped in vinaigrette before and after cooking.

See also
 List of Italian dishes
 List of pork dishes

References
 

Italian cuisine
Cuisine of Tuscany
Pork dishes